The Waning Sex is a 1926 American silent romantic comedy film directed by Robert Z. Leonard. Based on the 1923 play of the same name by Fanny and Frederic Hatton, the film starred Norma Shearer and Conrad Nagel.

Synopsis
Nina Duane (Norma Shearer) is a criminal lawyer whose gender is professionally resented by Philip Barry (Conrad Nagel), the District Attorney. She wins acquittal for man-chasing widow Mary Booth (Mary McAllister), then defeats her in romancing the D.A.

Cast

Preservation
Prints of The Waning Sex currently exists in the film archives of the Museum of Modern Art and Centre national du cinéma et de l'image animée in Fort de Bois-d'Arcy, France.

References

External links

Lobby card and stills at normashearer.com

1926 films
1926 romantic comedy films
American romantic comedy films
American silent feature films
American black-and-white films
Films directed by Robert Z. Leonard
American films based on plays
Metro-Goldwyn-Mayer films
Films with screenplays by F. Hugh Herbert
1920s American films
Silent romantic comedy films
Silent American comedy films